Polish Affairs is a Polish conservative-liberal parliamentary group formed on 29 April 2021 by two opposition MPs and one ruling party MP. The leader of the circle is Agnieszka Ścigaj. Two former government representatives, Zbigniew Girzyński and Małgorzata Janowska joined Polish Affairs on 8 July 2021. Although the latter left the circle later that year.

Deputies
One deputy was elected on the Polish Coalition list, while two deputies were elected on United Right list.

 Agnieszka Ścigaj - Elected on Polish Coalition list, former Kukiz'15 member, leader of the group.
 Zbigniew Girzyński - Elected on United Right list, former Law and Justice member.
 Andrzej Sośnierz - Elected on United Right list, former Agreement member.

Ideology
The circle does not present a larger set of unified ideologies, aside from being a moderate centre-right, conservative-liberal pro-government force.

References

External links
Official website

2021 establishments in Poland
Political parties established in 2021